Avis Gray (born September 3, 1954) is a politician in Manitoba, Canada. She was a member of the Legislative Assembly of Manitoba from 1988 to 1990, and again from 1992 to 1995.

Biography
Gray was born in Virden, Manitoba, and was educated at the University of Manitoba.  She subsequently worked as a home economist, and was a member of the Manitoba Home Economics Association and the Canadian Home Economics Association.

Gray was first elected to the Manitoba legislature in the 1988 provincial election as a Liberal, defeating incumbent New Democrat Harvey Smith by 624 votes in the central Winnipeg riding of Ellice. The election was won by the Progressive Conservatives, and Gray joined 19 other Liberals in the official opposition. She argued for an increase in welfare rates during this period.

The Liberals fell back to seven seats in the 1990 provincial election, and Gray lost to NDP candidate Conrad Santos by 108 votes. Two years later, she returned to the legislature via a by-election in the south Winnipeg riding of Crescentwood, defeating NDP candidate Tim Sale by 441 votes.

Despite an early lead in the polls, the Manitoba Liberal Party ran a poor campaign in the 1995 provincial election and fell from seven to three seats.  Gray placed last in a close three-way race in Crescentwood, finishing behind Sale and PC candidate Debbie Vivian. She has not sought a return to the legislature since this time.

Gray worked as the campaign manager for federal Liberal cabinet minister Reg Alcock when he ran for re-election in Winnipeg South in the 2004 federal election, and was subsequently hired as a lobbyist of the Canadian Wheat Board, a department under Alcock's ministry.

Election results

References

Manitoba Liberal Party MLAs
1954 births
Living people
Women MLAs in Manitoba
People from Virden, Manitoba